Fylde is a constituency in Lancashire which is represented in the House of Commons of the UK Parliament since 2010 by Mark Menzies, a Conservative.

History

The Fylde constituency was originally formed for the 1918 general election, but was abolished for the 1950 general election, when it was split into Fylde North and Fylde South. For the 1983 general election those two constituencies were merged to form a new Fylde constituency.
 
The seat was reduced in the boundary review leading to the 2010 United Kingdom general election, losing most of its elements from the Borough of Wyre and the City of Preston to the new seat of Wyre and Preston North.

Boundaries

1918–1945: The Urban Districts of Fleetwood, Kirkham, Longridge, Poulton-le-Fylde, Thornton, and Walton-le-Dale, the Rural District of Preston, and part of the Rural District of Fylde.

1945–1950: Part of the County Borough of Preston; the Municipal Borough of Fleetwood; the Urban Districts of Kirkham, Longridge, Poulton-le-Fylde, Thornton Cleveleys, Walton-le-Dale, and part of Fulwood; and, the Rural District of Fylde, and parts of Blackburn, and Preston.

1983–1997: The Borough of Fylde, and the Borough of Preston ward of Preston Rural West.

1997–2010: The Borough of Fylde, the Borough of Preston wards of Ingol and Preston Rural West, and the Borough of Wyre ward of Great Eccleston.

2010–present: The Borough of Fylde, and the City of Preston ward of Lea.

The constituency has three main population centres, namely Kirkham/Wesham, Lytham St Annes and Freckleton. Kirkham, Wesham and Freckleton are small towns with some light industrial development and have a considerable Labour vote, but Lytham and St Annes are comfortable seaside resorts, favoured by families and retired couples, and along with the more rural parts of the seat, are safely Conservative.

Members of Parliament

MPs 1918–1950

MPs since 1983

Election results

Elections in the 2010s

Elections in the 2000s

Elections in the 1990s

Elections in the 1980s

Elections 1918–1945

Election in the 1940s

Elections in the 1930s

Elections in the 1920s

Elections in the 1910s

See also
List of parliamentary constituencies in Lancashire

Notes

References

Parliamentary constituencies in North West England
Constituencies of the Parliament of the United Kingdom disestablished in 1950
Constituencies of the Parliament of the United Kingdom established in 1918
Constituencies of the Parliament of the United Kingdom established in 1983
Borough of Fylde